Mark Anthony Crowe (born 11 December 1965 in Southwold) is an English former professional footballer.

Crowe, a central defender, began his career as an apprentice with Norwich City and was captain of the Norwich  youth team that won the FA Youth Cup in 1983. He made his league debut, whilst still an apprentice, playing as a late substitute in a match against Brighton & Hove Albion in December 1982. He turned professional the following month, but that one appearance was his only game for the Norwich first team.

Crowe joined Torquay United on a free transfer in July 1985, scoring twice in 57 games for the Gulls, before a move to Cambridge United in December 1986. He played 51 times for Cambridge before moving into non-league football, playing for Watton and Thetford Town before joining Wroxham. In the 1999 close season, Crowe joined Lowestoft Town as player-coach, though notwithstanding a legal challenge from Wroxham who still held his registration, and who Mark still had 2 years left on his contract with. Eventually an FA ruling provided in Lowestoft's favour.

Crowe joined Kirkley in the 2003 close season.

Honours
 FA Youth cup winner 1983

External links
Career information at ex-canaries.co.uk

Sources
Canary Citizens by Mark Davage, John Eastwood, Kevin Platt, published by Jarrold Publishing, (2001), 

1965 births
People from Southwold
Living people
Norwich City F.C. players
Torquay United F.C. players
Cambridge United F.C. players
Watton United F.C. players
Thetford Town F.C. players
Wroxham F.C. players
Lowestoft Town F.C. players
Kirkley & Pakefield F.C. players
English footballers
Association football central defenders